Union Sportive Football De Bordj Bou Arreridj commonly known as USF Bordj Bou Arreridj or simply USFBBA is an Algerian Ligue Nationale football club based in Bordj Bou Arreridj. The club was founded in 2001.

History

By season
{|class="wikitable"
|-bgcolor="#efefef"
! Season
! Division
! Pos.
! G
! W
! D
! L
! GS
! GA
! P
!Cup
!Notes
|-
|2010–11
|Inter-Régions
| 13
|align=right|30 ||align=right|8 ||align=right|7 ||align=right|15
|align=right|26 ||align=right|45 ||align=right|31
||
|
|-
|2011–12
|Inter-Régions
| 2
|align=right|26 ||align=right|13 ||align=right|5 ||align=right|8
|align=right|34 ||align=right|29 ||align=right|44
||
|
|-
|2012–13
|Inter-Régions
|align=right bgcolor=#DDFFDD| 1
|align=right|-||align=right|-||align=right|-||align=right|-
|align=right|-||align=right|-||align=right|-
||
|
|-
|2013–14
|LNF Amateur
|6
|align=right|30 ||align=right|11 ||align=right|7 ||align=right|12
|align=right|30 ||align=right|34 ||align=right|40
||
|
|-
|2014–15
|LNF Amateur
|
|align=right| ||align=right| ||align=right| ||align=right| 
|align=right| ||align=right| ||align=right| 
||
|
|}

References

External links

Football clubs in Algeria
Association football clubs established in 2001
2001 establishments in Algeria
Sports clubs in Algeria